is a Japanese character designer, manga artist, and one of the founding members of the Gainax anime studio.

Personal life

Before Gainax was founded under the official name (it was originally called Daicon Film), Yoshiyuki served as animator on the second animated project, the Daicon IV opening animation. His first assignment as a character designer in Gainax was for Royal Space Force: The Wings of Honnêamise, released in 1987. Sadamoto has since had many works credited to him, one of the most notable being Neon Genesis Evangelion where he worked as a designer for the characters. Yoshiyuki's three most recent films include: The Girl Who Leapt Through Time (2006), Summer Wars (2009), and Wolf Children (2012) for which he was the character designer.

According to Yasuo Otsuka, who guided Sadamoto as a newcomer, there are only three people whom he regarded as more skillful than himself that he has met during his career. One of them is Yoshiyuki Sadamoto. The other two are Sadao Tsukioka who became a visual creator, and award-winning director Hayao Miyazaki. When Otsuka met the three men, he seems to have felt that he was taking off his hat to them at once. However, he thinks that only Miyazaki completely mastered a genuinely superior animation technique at present. He guesses, "A too excellent person might despair in the group work".

During an interview with Japanese Entertainment website Nihongogo done in 2013, it was revealed that Sadamoto is a stickler for details and wouldn't feel comfortable illustrating anything too unfamiliar to him. "In general, I don’t want to draw something that I have to study further in order to draw. For example, I could not draw a medical manga because it’s impossible for me to make a lie about medicine. Also things like Soccer and Baseball. I am unfamiliar with these worlds so it would be too difficult to show the actual plays." When asked about dream collaborations he revealed an interest in working with Robert Westall and Philip K. Dick but apologized "These are all deceased people, sorry."

Controversy
On August 9, 2019, Sadamoto criticized on Twitter a statue featured in the “After ‘Freedom of Expression’?” historical art exhibition at the Aichi Prefecture Museum of Art, Statue of Peace (2011), by Kim Seo-kyung and Kim Eun-sang memorializing Comfort Woman, girls who worked in wartime brothels in World War II for the Japanese military. The statue was first installed by its creators in front of the Japanese embassy in Seoul as a form of political protest. He also criticized a movie in the exhibition that showed a picture of the Emperor of Japan being burned and then stomped underfoot, he referred to it as "indistinguishable from a certain country's style of propaganda". Sadamoto said "I wanted it to be an art event with academic contemporary art at its core...Remove the crazy [propaganda]-affirming media and the exhibition could still be redeemed." he follows "I'm not going to completely reject the act of turning propaganda into art, but honestly speaking, it did not speak to me at all on an artistic level." His comments have been criticized by some Koreans and English speakers who replied to his tweet with displeasure of his views.

Works

Artbooks
Sadamoto Yoshiyuki Art Book ALPHA (Published April 1, 1993) 
Sadamoto Yoshiyuki Art Book DER MOND [Limited Edition] (Published September 30, 1999) 
Sadamoto Yoshiyuki Art Book DER MOND [Popular Edition] (Published January 31, 2000) 
Sadamoto Yoshiyuki Art Book CARMINE [Limited Edition] (Published March 26, 2009) 
Sadamoto Yoshiyuki Art Book CARMINE [Regular Edition] (Published August 26, 2010) 
Yoshiyuki Sadamoto CD-ROM art collection (GAINAX sale in 1993)

References

 Yuki, Masahiro. "The Official Art of .hack//Roots". (May 2007) Newtype USA. pp. 101–107.

External links

, translated in Animerica in Vol. 6, issue No. 8
 in Der Mond
 in Anime News Network
 in a Twilight contest

 

Anti-Korean sentiment in Japan
Japanese animators
Anime character designers
Gainax
1962 births
Living people
Manga artists from Yamaguchi Prefecture
Tokyo Zokei University alumni